Sweet Kind of Blue is the third studio album by Australian singer-songwriter Emily Barker. It was released on 19 May 2019 through Everyone Sang Records.

The album was nominated at the 2018 Americana Music Association for Best Album of the Year.

Track listing

Charts

References

2017 albums